UPMC Central Pa, part of the University of Pittsburgh Medical Center (UPMC) system as of September 1, 2017, is a healthcare provider in central Pennsylvania and surrounding rural communities. It has more than two thousand nine hundred physicians and allied health professionals and approximately eleven thousand employees serve a 10-county area at outpatient facilities and seven acute care hospitals with over 1,360 licensed beds: UPMC Harrisburg, UPMC Community Osteopathic, UPMC West Shore, UPMC Carlisle, UPMC Hanover, UPMC Lititz, and UPMC Memorial. The not-for-profit system anticipates providing $17 million in community benefits and caring for more than 1.2 million  residents in FY 2018.

List of UPMC Central Pa facilities 

On September 11, 2017, UPMC Pinnacle unveiled its new branding since officially merging with UPMC.

Location of Hospitals
UPMC Carlisle in Carlisle, Pennsylvania
UPMC Community Osteopathic in Harrisburg, Pennsylvania
UPMC Hanover in Hanover, Pennsylvania
UPMC Harrisburg in downtown Harrisburg
Polyclinic Medical Center in uptown Harrisburg
UPMC Lititz in Lititz, Pennsylvania
UPMC Memorial in York, Pennsylvania
UPMC West Shore in Mechanicsburg, Pennsylvania

Former facilities:
Seidle Memorial Hospital in Mechanicsburg, Pennsylvania

Location of outpatient facilities in Pennsylvania: 
Annville, Camp Hill, Carlisle (several locations), Chambersburg,
Dillsburg, Enola, 
Harrisburg (several locations), Hershey, Hummelstown,
Lemoyne, 
Mechanicsburg (several locations), 
Middletown, 
Millersburg, 
Newport, Shippensburg.

See also
 List of hospitals in Harrisburg

References

Healthcare in Pennsylvania
Hospitals in Pennsylvania
Healthcare in Harrisburg, Pennsylvania
Companies based in Harrisburg, Pennsylvania
1996 establishments in Pennsylvania
University of Pittsburgh Medical Center